Bohumír Dvorský (21 October 1902 in Paskov – 11 January 1976 in Svatý Kopeček) was a Czech painter. Strongly influenced by Julius Mařák and Paul Cézanne, his works generally had social themes.

Life
Bohumír Dvorský was supposed to become a bookbinder, however, he became attracted by painting. In 1924 he started to attend the Academy of Fine Arts, the studio of landscape painting led by Otakar Nejedlý. He travelled a lot during his studies; apart from trips to South Bohemia he travelled to paint in Italy, France and Corsica. After completing his studies he lived in the Ostrava Region and before the beginning of World War II he moved to Svatý Kopeček near Olomouc where he lived until his death.

During the period at the Academy he was influenced considerably by the landscape painter Julius Mařák and during his trips to France he was strongly inspired by the selection of colour tones and style of Cézanne. During his stay in the Ostrava Region he paid attention to industrial landscapes and social topics. Consequently, the colour schemes of his paintings also changed. After his move to Hanakia the colour tones grew warmer and the prevailing topics of his paintings were bouquets and the so-called ‘King Rides in Folk Costume’.

Bohumír Dvorský is one of the most important Moravian landscape painters who often presented his work at foreign exhibitions. In 1940 he participated in the Venice Biennale and, again in Rio de Janeiro and Helsinki in 1948 and at Stockholm a year later. In 1971 he was awarded the title of National Artist. The parental home of Bohumír Dvorský is at 238 Kirilova Street in Paskov.

Literature
PELIKÁNOVÁ, Gabriela; KAHÁNKOVÁ, Taťána. Rodáci a významné osobnosti Moravskoslezského kraje . Ostrava, Moravian-Silesian Region, 2006. Ostrava : Moravskoslezský kraj, 2006. S. 11 S. 12.

See also
 List of Czech painters

1902 births
1976 deaths
20th-century Czech painters
Czech male painters
People from Frýdek-Místek District
20th-century Czech male artists